Introvision was a variation on a front-projection process that allowed film makers to view a finished composite of live action and plate photography through the camera's viewfinder on set and in real time. During its heyday, starting with the feature film, Outland in 1981, Introvision enjoyed the novelty of visual effect compositing in-camera, thus eliminating the need to wait for photo-chemical compositing to determine if the effect shot was successful.  

President of Introvision Systems, Tom Naud, explained it this way:  "Introvision utilizes a Scotchlite screen - ours happen to be thirty feet tall by sixty feet wide—so in that regard, we're front screen projection.  But the finished piece of film produced on our system bears no other resemblance to standard front projection.' 

Another benefit to the Introvision process was the ability to place an actor 'inside' a plate, meaning an actor could walk vertically or laterally inside a two-dimensional background image and seemingly go behind objects within any given environment. The actual background on the set was black, so the actor would have to pantomime walking through and around certain objects. Done well, the illusion was nearly perfect, particularly with precise lighting and careful miniature set construction (or previously photographed images, which was done in The Fugitive with a train superimposed behind actor Harrison Ford).

The system faded from use around 1994, due to the widespread adoption of Digital compositing and Matchmoving, which allowed live action characters to be placed in fully or partially computer-generated backgrounds, or computer-generated characters to be combined with live action characters—and sometimes both at the same time.

The Introvision system 
The front projection screen - custom made from thousands of pentagonal-shaped Scotchlite pieces to eliminate seam lines which might show on the finished film - sits at the far end of the stage.  Despite its formidable size, a four-man crew could mount the screen on its tubular steel frame and erect the system in about two hours.  On the opposite end of the stage is the compact projector/camera unit.  As with other front-projection systems, Introvision made use of the light reflectance characteristics of the Scotchlite screen, which returns light to its source virtually undiminished, but only directly in line with that source.  At oblique angles, the light intensity drops off drastically and the image dissipates.  Therefore, in order to apply this phenomenon photographically, both projector and camera must be positioned along precisely the same axis - a physical impossibility sidestepped by the employment of a beam splitter.  The beam splitter, mounted at a 45-degree angle to the projector axis, aligns the projected image directly to the camera's focal plane, even though the camera and projector are actually positioned at right angles to each other.  The mirrored beam-splitter kicks part of the projected image up onto the screen, but being semi-transparent, also allows the camera to see through it, and thereby record the image reflected back. 

Actors and set pieces were placed directly in front of the screen, because the projected image was so brilliant, the intensity of light needed to balance 'live' elements to the screen obliterated the projected image from anything in the foreground. Since the projector and camera were in perfect alignment, the foreground elements themselves blocked any unwanted shadows that they may have cast on the screen.

Origins of the Introvision process 
Introvision was created by John Eppolito, who was a stage magician and hypnotist. He spent most of his adult life working as a radio producer and director for ABC, and then in the early 1970s transitioned to film production.  Along with USC film student Les Robley, Eppolito set up shop in a garage tinkering with front projection. Introvision International 1011 North Fuller Ave Hollywood CA was formed, expanded, and operated from 1980 to 2000 by President Tom Naud, Head Camera Production Operations Bill Mesa, and Studio Facility Builder, Set Builder and Studio Manager Issachar Issy Shabtay.

Notable film titles  
 Outland (1981)
 Inside the Third Reich (1982 miniseries)
 Megaforce (1982)
 Two of a Kind (1983)
 Oh, God! You Devil (1984)
 Stand by Me (1986)
 Rambo III (1988)
 Lock Up (1989)
 Driving Miss Daisy (1989)
 Darkman (1990)
 Army of Darkness (1992)
 Under Siege (1992)
 The Fugitive (1993)

Special effects